Alan Peacock (born 29 October 1937 in Middlesbrough, North Riding of Yorkshire) is an English former footballer.

He spent the majority of his career at Middlesbrough, also playing for Leeds United and Plymouth Argyle. He joined Middlesbrough in 1954 and became a regular in the side in 1958 alongside Brian Clough. Clough scored the majority of the goals, partly due to Peacock's unselfish attitude in front of goal. Clough joined Sunderland in 1961 and the following season Peacock scored 24 in 34 games.

Peacock's high scoring rate earned him a place in the 1962 World Cup England squad. He made his international debut in the Group Four victory over Argentina. Since then only Allan Clarke in 1970 has made his debut in a World Cup finals match. In total, he earned 6 caps and scored 3 goals for England, two of which came in a 4–0 victory over Wales in November 1962.

In 1964 he moved to Leeds United for £55,000 to help Don Revie's team with promotion, which was achieved that season with Peacock scoring 8 goals in 14 games. He stayed at Leeds for a further three seasons scoring 30 goals in 65 games, yet more frequent injuries forced his sale to Plymouth Argyle for £10,000 in 1967 where he played only one season before being forced to retire due to injuries at only 30 years old in 1968. He returned to his home town after retirement.

Peacock wore the number-9 shirt, and recently sold his newsagents shop in Ormesby, Middlesbrough, having owned it for forty years.

References

1937 births
Living people
Footballers from Middlesbrough
English footballers
England international footballers
1962 FIFA World Cup players
Middlesbrough F.C. players
Leeds United F.C. players
Plymouth Argyle F.C. players
Association football forwards
FA Cup Final players